Aceh Jaya Regency is a regency  of Aceh Special Region, Indonesia. It is located on the island of Sumatra. The regency covers an area of 3,814 square kilometres and had a population of 76,782 people at the 2010 census and 93,159 at the 2020 Census, of whom 47,264 were male and 45,895 female. The official estimate as at mid 2021 was 94,418. The seat of the Regency is Calang, in Krueng Sabee District. The main crops grown in the Regency are rice, rambutan, durian, orange, water melon, rubber, palm and coconut oil.

Administrative divisions 
As at 2010, the regency was divided administratively into six districts (kecamatan); however, three additional districts (Indra Jaya, Darul Hikmah and Pasie Raya) have since been created by the division of existing districts. The nine districts, listed below with their areas and their populations at the 2010 Census and the 2020 Census, together with the official estimates as at mid 2021. The table also includes the locations of the district administrative centres, the number of villages (Aceh: gampong) in each, and the district post code.

Note: (a) the 2010 populations of the new districts are included in the totals for the districts from which they were divided. (b) includes three small offshore islands. (c) includes a small offshore island.

Earthquake 
On December 26, 2004, the regency was affected by the Indian Ocean earthquake. The Indonesian Government has announced that a rebuilt Calang will be sited further inland, although individual families and businesses are rebuilding at the same location along the coast. By October 2006 substantial parts of the town of Calang had been reconstructed, including a small hotel and a number of restaurants and other businesses. By the end of 2006 a total of 15,000 houses and 57,000 permanent houses had been reconstructed in the regency. Many people along the coast are still in transitional housing but progress has been made by the various local and many international organizations such as the Red Cross and USAID who are assisting with the reconstruction.

References

External links 

 

Regencies of Aceh